The Cal State Northridge Matadors men's basketball statistical leaders are individual statistical leaders of the Cal State Northridge Matadors men's basketball program in various categories, including points, rebounds, assists, steals, and blocks. Within those areas, the lists identify single-game, single-season, and career leaders. The Matadors represent California State University, Northridge in the NCAA's Big West Conference.

Cal State Northrdige began competing in intercollegiate basketball in 1958.  The NCAA did not officially record assists as a stat until the 1983–84 season, and blocks and steals until the 1985–86 season, but Cal State Northridge's record books includes players in these stats before these seasons. These lists are updated through the end of the 2020–21 season.

Scoring

Rebounds

Assists

Steals

Blocks

References

Lists of college basketball statistical leaders by team
Statistical